IVL C.24 was the first aircraft to be designed in Finland and built in an industrial environment. The aircraft was manufactured by IVL, but only in one example.

The designer of the aircraft was engineer Kurt Berger. The aircraft made its maiden flight on April 16, 1924, piloted by Georg Jäderholm.

The aircraft was a one seated, high-wing monoplane. It was designed as a fighter, but its engine was under-powered, the speed moderate and flight characteristics poor. The visibility from the pilot's seat was also very poor. The aircraft was in Finnish Air Force use for a short time.

Operators

Finnish Air Force

Specifications (C.24)

|crew=One, pilot
|capacity=
|length main=7.1 m
|length alt=23 ft 3 in
|span main=12.1 m
|span alt= 39 ft 8 in
|height main=2.9 m
|height alt=9 ft 6 in
|area main=19 m2
|area alt= 204.4 ft2
|airfoil=
|empty weight main=660 kg
|empty weight alt=1,452 lb
|loaded weight main= kg
|loaded weight alt= lb
|useful load main= kg
|useful load alt= kg
|max takeoff weight main=870 kg
|max takeoff weight alt= 1,740 lb

See also

References

1920s Finnish fighter aircraft
High-wing aircraft
Single-engined tractor aircraft